Earlwood was an electoral district of the Legislative Assembly of the Australian state of New South Wales from 1950 to 1991. It included Earlwood and Beverly Hills.

At the 1991 election, it was abolished and its area split between the seats of Canterbury, Hurstville and Rockdale.

Members for Earlwood

Election results

References

Former electoral districts of New South Wales
1950 establishments in Australia
1991 disestablishments in Australia
Constituencies established in 1950
Constituencies disestablished in 1991